The Uganda Film Festival Award for Best Actor is an award presented annually by Uganda Communications Commission (UCC) at the Uganda Film Film Festival. It is given in honor of a male actor who has exhibited outstanding acting while working in the film industry in Uganda. The award was introduced in 2014 with Isaac Kuddzu as the first winner for his acting work on Felista's Fable.

Winners and nominees
The table shows the winners and nominees for the Best Actor in a Feature Film award.

Multiple wins and nominations
The following individuals have won multiple Best Best Actor in a Feature film:

The following actors have received two or more Best Actor nominations

References

Ugandan film awards